Avaj (also Romanized as Avej; also known as Aveh) is a city and capital of Avaj District, in Avaj County, Qazvin Province, Iran. At the 2006 census its population was 3,695, in 1,042 families.

It is located in Qazvin province and has an estimated population of 5,142. It lies in an agricultural area. Avaj was near the epicenter of the 2002 Bou'in-Zahra earthquake and thus was severely affected by it, with roughly half the town being razed.

References

Avaj County
Cities in Qazvin Province